Cheryl A. Zimmer is a conservation biologist whose research interests are focused marine population ecology, specifically the role of hydrodynamics as a driving force in the evolution of marine life.

Education and career 
Zimmer has a B.A. (1976) and an M.A. (1980) from San Jose State University (1976). She earned her Ph.D. in 1984 from the Massachusetts Institute of Technology where she worked with J. Frederick Grassle. From 1986 to 2000, Zimmer was a scientist at Woods Hole Oceanographic Institution; as of 2021 she is a professor at the University of California, Los Angeles where she runs the Zimmer Lab, in collaboration with her husband and colleague Richard Zimmer.

Selected publications

Awards and honors 
Young Investigator Award, Office of Naval Research (1986) 
Fellow, American Association for the Advancement of Science (1996) 
Pew Fellows Program in Marine Conservation (1997)

References

Living people
1954 births
University of California, Los Angeles faculty
Massachusetts Institute of Technology alumni
San Jose State University alumni
Women marine biologists
Evolutionary biologists